MS Thorbjørn (call sign LILU) is a vessel owned by AUF. During AUFs annual summer camp on the island of Utøya, the vessel shuttles the participants between Utøya and Utøykaia on the mainland. The vessel was built at Oskarshamn Shipyard in 1948. It was later renamed Thorbjørn after Thorbjørn Jagland, a former AUF leader who later became Prime Minister of Norway. The ferry is certified for 50 passengers and can carry small vehicles.

History
Before the vessel was converted into a civilian passenger ferry, it was a military landing craft of the L-50-type. These landing crafts were used by the Swedish Navy and the Swedish Coastal Artillery from the 1950s to the 1980s. The L50-boats were used by Coastal Rangers for fast landing of personnel under fire.

2011 Norway attacks

In July 2011 MS Thorbjørn was used by Anders Behring Breivik to reach Utøya before his attack on the AUF summer camp. A few minutes after the first shots were fired, the vessel left the island with only nine people on board. Hence the ferry was not available to the police when they arrived at Utøykaia, the normal ferry landing on mainland.

The vessel was used in the rescue work shortly after the shooter was arrested. The captain of the ferry, Jon Olson, was transporting the police and rescue workers to Utøya and campers from Utøya to the mainland throughout the night.

Gallery

References

External links 
Norwegian Ship Register

2011 Norway attacks
1948 ships
Ships built in Oskarshamn
Ferries of Norway
Merchant ships of Norway
Naval ships of Sweden
Landing craft